The following is a comprehensive ist of leaders of Azerbaijan's state security agencies since the republic's establishment in 1918.

Azerbaijan Democratic Republic

Heads of the Organization to struggle against counterrevolution of Azerbaijan Democratic Republic

Azerbaijan SSR

Heads of the Azerbaijani Cheka, GPU and OGPU

Minister of Internal Affairs (Azerbaijan) - People's Commissar of Internal Affairs of Azerbaijan SSR

People's Commissar and Ministers of State Security of the Azerbaijan SSR 
(List incomplete)

Minister of Internal Affairs (Azerbaijan) - Ministers of Internal Affairs of Azerbaijan SSR

In 1953, the Ministry of Internal Affairs of the Azerbaijan SSR and the Ministry of Public Security of the Azerbaijan SSR were merged into a single Ministry of Internal Affairs of Azerbaijan SSR. In 1954 was founded the KGB of Azerbaijan SSR.

Chairmen of the KGB of Azerbaijan SSR

Ministers of National Security of Azerbaijan

References

External links
 HEADS OF SPECIAL SERVICES OF AZERBAIJAN  
 Органы ВЧК-ГПУ-ОГПУ в Закавказье. (1918-1934 гг.)

Government of Azerbaijan